Mount Jefferson is the highest mountain in both the Toquima Range and Nye County in Nevada, United States. It is the sixth highest mountain in the state. This makes it the most prominent peak in Nye County and the third most prominent peak in Nevada (after Charleston Peak and Wheeler Peak). For similar reasons, it is also the highest mountain for over 90 miles in all directions. During the Pleistocene, alpine glaciers eroded several cirques east of the summit plateau.

See also
 List of Ultras of the United States

References

External links

 
 
 
 

Mountains of Nevada
Mountains of Nye County, Nevada
Mountains of the Great Basin
Humboldt–Toiyabe National Forest
North American 3000 m summits